The Movement for Democracy and Progress (MDP-Alkawali), also known as the Movement for Democracy and Pan-Africanism, is a political party in Niger.

History
The MDP was established in 1992. In the 1993 parliamentary elections it received 0.5% of the vote, failing to win a seat in the National Assembly. It also failed to win a seat in the 1995 elections, but won one seat in the 1996 elections, which were boycotted by the main opposition parties. Party leader Maï Manga Boukar was subsequently appointed Minister of Mines and Industry.

The party contested the 1999 parliamentary elections in alliance with the Party for Socialism and Democracy in Niger, but failed to win a seat.

References

Political parties in Niger
1992 establishments in Niger
Political parties established in 1992